Defri Rizki (born 10 December 1988) is an Indonesian professional footballer who plays as a winger or attacking midfielder for Liga 1 club RANS Nusantara. Previously, he has played for Persija Jakarta, Semen Padang, Mitra Kukar and PSPS Pekanbaru. He was born in Takengon.

Club career 
He previously played for Persiraja Banda Aceh. On January 5, 2013, he signed with Persija Jakarta. On November 12, 2014, he signed a pre-contract with Barito Putera but later decided to sign a contract with Mitra Kukar. On February, 2016 he signed a year Contract with Semen Padang FC. In 2018, he rejoined his former club Persiraja Banda Aceh to play in Liga 2.

Honours

Club 
Mitra Kukar
 General Sudirman Cup: 2015
Persiraja Banda Aceh
 Liga 2 third place (play-offs): 2019

References

External links 
 
 Defri Rizki at Liga Indonesia

1988 births
Living people
Indonesian footballers
Indonesian Premier Division players
Liga 1 (Indonesia) players
Liga 2 (Indonesia) players
Persiraja Banda Aceh players
Persikabo Bogor players
Persih Tembilahan players
Persija Jakarta players
Mitra Kukar players
Semen Padang F.C. players
PSPS Pekanbaru players
RANS Nusantara F.C. players
Association football midfielders
People from Bogor
Sportspeople from West Java